Heart to Heart International is a global humanitarian organization based in Lenexa, Kansas with a mission of seeking to improve healthcare access around the world by ensuring quality care is provided equitably in medically under-resourced communities and in disaster situations.

History
Heart to Heart International was founded in 1992 by Dr. Gary Morsch and other Rotary Club members who delivered medication to victims of the Chernobyl disaster in Russia. In 30 years, it has shipped more than $2.4 billion in humanitarian aid to more than 130 countries. A large focus of HHI's mission is disaster response, and HHI has been a first responder to disasters all over the world. Heart to Heart International's headquarters is located in Lenexa, Kansas.

As of the end of September 2022, Heart to Heart had sent $88 million in medications and medical supplies to 12 Ukrainian organizations.

See also
 Canadian Food for the Hungry
 Feed the Children
 Food for the Hungry
 Food for the Poor, Inc.

References

External links
Heart to Heart International
Charity Navigator

Health charities in the United States
Medical and health organizations based in Kansas